Pan Kilang hill is one of the tourist centers in Northeastern part of Nigeria. It is located in Kaltungo, a local government area of Gombe State. It is a  beautiful volcanic hill  in the south of Gombe and its conical peak is one of the highest peak in Nigeria.

Pan Kilang Hill has an elevation of 1,102 meters above sea level. It is the most elevated mountain out of the twenty three mountains in Gombe State and the first in Kaltungo Local Government. By prominence, it is the fifty first ( 51st) out of two thousand and seventy four ( 2074) in Nigeria, first (1st)  out of twenty three in (23) in Gombe and the 1st  In Kaltungo.

References 

Gombe State
Tourist attractions in Nigeria
Hiking in Nigeria